USNS Marie Tharp (T-AGS-66) is a  oceanographic survey ship operated by the Military Sealift Command of the United States Navy. The seventh ship in her class, Marie Tharp is named for oceanographer Marie Tharp; the ship was renamed in 2023 from Maury.

The-then Maurys keel was laid on 1 February 2011 in a ceremony at the VT Halter Marine shipyard in Moss Point, Mississippi. The hull was launched on 27 March 2013 and the ship was delivered on 16 February 2016. Maury completed her maiden voyage in June 2016.

Details
Marie Tharp was the first oceanographic survey ship built since  was launched in 2000. This modification is to accommodate a  moon pool for unmanned vehicle deployment and retrieval.

Name change
The National Defense Authorization Act for Fiscal Year 2020 created a new Naming Commission to examine names across the US armed forces that honor the Confederate States of America, the group of states that attempted to break away from the US during the American Civil War. 

In September 2022, the Naming Commission recommended the renaming of Maury and cruiser , with the new names to be decided by the Secretary of the Navy. Maury was named after military officer and diplomatic envoy Matthew Fontaine Maury, the "Father of Modern Oceanography" who resigned from a 36-year career in the US Navy to accept a command in the Confederate States Navy during the American Civil War. 

On 8 March 2023, International Women's Day, the US Navy Secretary, Carlos Del Toro, announced the ship would be renamed in honor of oceanographer Marie Tharp, best known for helping produce the first scientific map of the Atlantic Ocean floor. The renaming was formally completed in the Naval Vessel Register on 13 March 2023.

References

External links

 USNS Maury (T-AGS 66)

 

Pathfinder-class survey ships
Ships built in Moss Point, Mississippi
2013 ships